The Canon de 305 mm Modèle 1893/96 was a heavy naval gun used as the main armament of a number of French pre-dreadnoughts during World War I. It equipped the Charlemagne, République and Liberté-class battleships as well as the unique battleships Iéna and Suffren. It was also used as railway artillery in World War I.

Description
The 12-inch/40 calibre Canon de 305 mm Modèle 1893/96 gun was a typical built-up French heavy gun of its period. It used a Welin interrupted-screw breech and bagged propellant with a de Bange obturator to get a good gas seal during firing. It was mounted in twin-gun turrets which had a couple of unusual features. First, most of the turret's operating machinery was housed inside the turret, with only an armored tube to protect the ammunition hoists. This made little difference in the overall weight of the turret, but did raise the machinery higher in the ship than the turrets of other nations, which did have implications for stability. Secondly, they used a hydraulic pivot to lift the turret when it rotated; this was lowered onto a seating ring when the turret was in the proper position to fire. Each turret had a nominal 300° of traverse, although each ship had its own specific limitations.

Related Guns

The 12-inch/45 calibre Canon de 305mm/45 Modèle 1893 gun was an experimental longer barrel version of this design, mounted in single gun turrets in Jauréguiberry and Bouvet.

World War I railway gun
During World War I surplus Modèle 1893/1896 guns were mounted on both rotating centre-pintle, cradle recoil, and sliding-carriage mountings on railway carriages to provide mobile firepower on the Western Front. The railroad mounts had a maximum elevation of 40° which accounts for the extra range over the naval guns.

Ammunition 
 APC (Armor Piercing Capped) - 
 CI (Cast iron) - 
 SAPC (Semi-Armor Piercing Capped) -

See also

Weapons of comparable role, performance and era
 Armstrong Whitworth 12 inch /40 naval gun British equivalent naval gun
 BL 12-inch railway gun British equivalent railway gun
 Russian 12 inch 40 caliber naval gun Russian equivalent naval gun

Notes

References

External links 

 PIECES LOURDES : 240 et plus
 French 305 mm/40 (12") Model 1893/1896

Naval guns of France
305 mm artillery